The 2015 BetVictor World Matchplay was the 22nd annual staging of the World Matchplay, organised by the Professional Darts Corporation. The tournament took place at the Winter Gardens, Blackpool, from 18–26 July 2015.

Phil Taylor was the defending champion, having won the last seven editions of the event and he reached the semi-finals, where his 38-game unbeaten run came to the end against James Wade. Michael van Gerwen won his first World Matchplay title by defeating Wade 18–12 in the final.

Prize money
The prize fund was increased to £450,000 after being £400,000 for the previous five editions of this event.

Format
In previous stagings of the event all games had to be won by two clear legs with no sudden-death legs. However, in 2013 after consulting the host broadcaster Sky Sports, the PDC decided that games will now only proceed for a maximum of six extra legs before a tie-break leg is required. For example, in a best of 19 legs first round match, if the score reaches 12–12 then the 25th leg will be the decider.

Qualification
The top 16 on the PDC Order of Merit qualified as seeded players. The other 16 places went to the top 16 non-qualified players from the PDC ProTour Order of Merit who were unseeded players. The field was confirmed on 5 July following Players Championship 14.

PDC Order of Merit Top 16
  Michael van Gerwen (winner)
  Phil Taylor (semi-finals)
  Gary Anderson (second round)
  Adrian Lewis (second round)
  Peter Wright (semi-finals)
  James Wade (runner-up)
  Dave Chisnall (quarter-finals)
  Simon Whitlock (second round)
  Ian White (quarter-finals)
  Robert Thornton (first round)
  Brendan Dolan (second round)
  Mervyn King (first round)
  Michael Smith (first round)
  Terry Jenkins (first round)
  Raymond van Barneveld (first round)
  Justin Pipe (first round)

PDC ProTour qualifiers
  Kim Huybrechts (first round)
  Jelle Klaasen (first round)
  Vincent van der Voort (first round)
  Benito van de Pas (first round)
  Stephen Bunting (first round)
  Mensur Suljović (quarter-finals)
  Gerwyn Price (quarter-finals)
  Steve Beaton (first round)
  Jamie Caven (first round)
  John Henderson (first round)
  Keegan Brown (second round)
  Andrew Gilding (second round)
  Jamie Lewis (second round)
  Joe Murnan (first round)
  Kyle Anderson (first round)
  Andy Hamilton (second round)

Draw

Statistics
{|class="wikitable sortable" style="font-size: 95%; text-align: right"
|-
! Player
! Eliminated
! Played
! Legs Won
! Legs Lost
! LWAT
! 100+
! 140+
! 180s
! High checkout
! 3-dart average
! Checkout success
|-
|align="left"|  Michael van Gerwen
| Winner
| 5
| 
| 
| 
| 
| 
| 
| 156
| 102.81
| 46.25%
|-
|align="left"|  James Wade
| Final
| 5
| 
| 
| 
| 
| 
| 
| 150
| 97.34
| 41.98%
|-
|align="left"|  Peter Wright
| Semi-finals
| 4
| 
| 
| 
| 
| 
| 
| 161
| 101.12
| 45.54%
|-
|align="left"|  Phil Taylor
|Semi-finals
| 4
| 
| 
| 
| 
| 
| 
| 161
| 100.27
| 39.85%
|-
|align="left"|  Ian White
| Quarter-finals
| 3
| 
| 
| 
| 
| 
| 
| 127
| 99.01
| 37.11%
|-
|align="left"|  Dave Chisnall
|Quarter-finals
| 3
| 
| 
| 
| 
| 
| 
| 136
| 97.87
| 31.19%
|-
|align="left"|  Gerwyn Price
| Quarter-finals
| 3
| 
| 
| 
| 
| 
| 
| 120
| 92.88
| 41.10%
|-
|align="left"|  Mensur Suljović
|Quarter-finals
| 3
| 
| 
| 
| 
| 
| 
| 128
| 91.54
| 35.71%
|-
|align="left"|  Adrian Lewis
| Second round
| 2
| 
| 
| 
| 
| 
| 
| 136
| 99.13
| 44.44%
|-
|align="left"|  Jamie Lewis
| Second round
| 2
| 
| 
| 
| 
| 
| 
| 128
| 95.65
| 50%
|-
|align="left"|  Simon Whitlock
| Second round
| 2
| 
| 
| 
| 
| 
| 
| 78
| 95.44
| 41.30%
|-
|align="left"|  Gary Anderson
| Second round
| 2
| 
| 
| 
| 
| 
| 
| 118
| 94.94
| 33.93%
|-
|align="left"|  Andrew Gilding
|Second round
| 2
| 
| 
| 
| 
| 
| 
| 121
| 93.76
| 42.50%
|-
|align="left"|  Keegan Brown
|Second round
| 2
| 
| 
| 
| 
| 
| 
| 114
| 93.32
| 43.75%
|-
|align="left"|  Andy Hamilton
| Second round
| 2
| 
| 
| 
| 
| 
| 
| 158
| 92.66
| 34.78%
|-
|align="left"|  Brendan Dolan
|Second round
| 2
| 
| 
| 
| 
| 
| 
| 170
| 89.70
| 32.14%
|-
|align="left"|  Stephen Bunting
| First round
| 1
| 6
| 10
| 1
| 18
| 6
| 9
| 49
| 101.62
| 33.33%
|-
|align="left"|  Kyle Anderson
| First round
| 1
| 7
| 10
| 3
| 26
| 5
| 9
| 124
| 99.06
| 30.43%
|-
|align="left"|  Kim Huybrechts
| First round
| 1
| 5
| 10
| 1
| 30
| 6
| 1
| 101
| 95.82
| 41.67%
|-
|align="left"|  Mervyn King
| First round
| 1
| 8
| 10
| 3
| 14
| 12
| 6
| 90
| 94.99
| 42.11%
|-
|align="left"|  Joe Murnan
| First round
| 1
| 7
| 10
| 3
| 21
| 13
| 2
| 86
| 93.79
| 41.18%
|-
|align="left"|  Benito van de Pas
| First round
| 1
| 4
| 10
| 3
| 12
| 8
| 3
| 66
| 93.62
| 40.00%
|-
|align="left"|  Robert Thornton
| First round
| 1
| 7
| 10
| 2
| 21
| 14
| 4
| 81
| 92.90
| 41.18%
|-
|align="left"|  Vincent van der Voort
| First round
| 1
| 6
| 10
| 3
| 25
| 9
| 4
| 68
| 92.78
| 26.09%
|-
|align="left"|  Jamie Caven
| First round
| 1
| 11
| 13
| 2
| 42
| 11
| 3
| 60
| 92.70
| 37.93%
|-

|align="left"|  Jelle Klaasen
| First round
| 1
| 4
| 10
| 1
| 20
| 3
| 3
| 108
| 91.46
| 40.00%
|-
|align="left"|  Michael Smith
| First round
| 1
| 4
| 10
| 1
| 13
| 11
| 1
| 121
| 91.17
| 33.33%
|-
|align="left"|  Terry Jenkins
| First round
| 1
| 9
| 11
| 4
| 28
| 16
| 6
| 140
| 90.24
| 28.13%
|-
|align="left"|  Justin Pipe
| First round
| 1
| 7
| 10
| 1
| 26
| 10
| 5
| 116
| 90.08
| 26.92%
|-
|align="left"|  Steve Beaton
| First round
| 1
| 4
| 10
| 2
| 21
| 9
| 1
| 40
| 89.7
| 16.67%
|-
|align="left"|  Raymond van Barneveld
| First round
| 1
| 7
| 10
| 2
| 22
| 12
| 3
| 96
| 89.08
| 33.33%
|-
|align="left"|  John Henderson
| First round
| 1
| 2
| 10
| 1
| 22
| 1
| 2
| 26
| 81.86
| 33.33%
|-

References

World Matchplay (darts)
World Matchplay
World Matchplay